Manaos (also known as Slaves from Prison Camp Manaos) is a 1979 Spanish-Italian-Méxican adventure film directed by Alberto Vázquez-Figueroa.

Cast 
 Fabio Testi: Arquimedes
 Agostina Belli: Claudia
 Jorge Rivero: Howard
 Andrés García: Carmelo Sierra
 Florinda Bolkan: Manuela Aranda
 : Ramiro
 Alberto de Mendoza: Mario Buendía

References

External links

1979 films
Italian adventure films
Spanish adventure films
1970s adventure films
Films scored by Fabio Frizzi
1970s Italian films